Arthur Benjamin "Chicho" Jesurun (10 July 1947 – 16 December 2006) was a Netherlands-Antillian baseball player, coach, manager, and scout.

Biography
During his playing career, Jesurun played for several teams. He started in Curaçao with the Korporaal Cardinals, later, in the 1960s he was one of the founders and players of the Caribe from Groningen in the Netherlands. In that period he also started his coaching career as a coach at the Rayon Het Noorden team.

In the 1970s and 1980s, Jesurun was working as a baseball coach in his native Curaçao with the Wildcats Felipe II and the Curaçao national baseball team. With this team he reached the second spot in the national league, before winning the league in three consecutive years. Later he also became an umpire in the sport.

Jesurun also worked as a scout for several Major League Baseball teams, including the Atlanta Braves and the Florida Marlins. During his time with the Braves, he brought fellow Antillean Andruw Jones to the team. He also worked for Venezuelan professional team Los Tiburones de la Guairia, where he become an assistant to the owner. Other teams he managed were the Amsterdam Pirates and Almere '90.

Jesurun also worked in other functions at Dutch clubs Pioniers and SV ADO. In the years prior to his death, he was a bench coach at HCAW, a Dutch baseball club from Bussum. The period in Amsterdam came after he worked for the Montreal Expos. The two teams became partners and the Pirates temporarily changed their name to the Amsterdam Expos, and were managed by Jesurun for four years. Besides Jones for the Braves, Jesurun contracted players like Vince Rooi, Danny Rombley, Tim van Pareren, Roger Bernadina (for the Expos), Rick VandenHurk, Kenny Berkenbosch and Jeffrey de Vrieze (for the Marlins).

As of 1977, Jesurun also worked on radio, starting as a baseball reporter, and later he presented the news for Radio Netherlands in the papiamento language. During the 2005 Baseball World Cup, which was held in the Netherlands, he was featured as a reporter on the Dutch sport broadcasting program Langs de Lijn.

Jesurun died in 2006 at the age of 59 due to a myocardial infarction.

Further reading
In Memoriam Wereldomroep

External links
Grand Slam Baseball & Softball Headlines - Honkbalcoach Chicho Jesurun overleden

1947 births
2006 deaths
Baseball coaches
Curaçao baseball players
Dutch people of Curaçao descent
People from Willemstad
Dutch sports journalists